Tewfik Saleh was an Egyptian film director and writer. His name has also been written as Tawfik Saleh and Tewfiq Salah.

Biography

Saleh was born on 27 October 1926, in Alexandria. Although his father was against his interest in movies,  he still considered movies to be his major interest. In 1949, he graduated from Victoria College of Alexandria. He died on 18 August 2013 in Cairo.

Career

His first film was Fools' Alley (1955), co-written by Naguib Mahfouz. Other movies include Struggle of the Heroes (Sirâ’el abtâl) (1962) and The Rebels (el Moutamarridoun) (1968) among others.

Selected filmography
 Struggle of the Heroes (1962)
 Sayed al-Bolti (1969)
 The Dupes (1973)
 Al-ayyam al-tawila (1980)

References

External links
 

University of Paris alumni
People from Alexandria
Egyptian film directors
1926 births
2013 deaths